Judith Porter is a former association football player who represented New Zealand at international level.

Porter made a single appearance for Football Ferns in a 2–2 draw with Australia on 6 October 1979.

References

Year of birth missing (living people)
Living people
New Zealand women's international footballers
New Zealand women's association footballers
Women's association football defenders